The Halstatt Formation is a geologic formation in Germany. It preserves fossils dating back to the Triassic period.

See also

 List of fossiliferous stratigraphic units in Germany

References

 

Triassic Germany